Siwan Davies is a Welsh professor of Physical Geography in the department of science at Swansea University.

Research
Davies' research focus is to analyze past climate change and to reconstruct past climate changes. Together with a team of lecturing staff, technicians, PhD students and post doctoral researchers Davies is looking at rapid climatic changes.  One of the challenges to understand why these changes occur is understanding where these events happen, are there triggers in the oceans or are there triggers in the atmosphere? By analyzing ash layers that have been spread across and therefore incorporated into ice and terrestrial matter from erupted volcanoes.  By analyzing the microscopic ash particles in these matters Davies and her team can measure differences and similarities in changes that have occurred. These findings help to date and explain when these changes happened and why.  By understanding what happened in the past will give them insight into what may happen in the future. Davies and her team are working closely with the ice and climate group at the University of Copenhagen as well as UK institutions such as Bangor and the University of Saint Andrews.

Davies is currently working in collaboration with scientists from 14 different countries to excavate ice from the northwest of Greenland as part of the North Greenland Eemian Ice Drilling (Neem) project.  The ice will be retrieved in layers as far down as 8000 ft.  The findings within this excavation will include evidence of organic materials as well as air bubbles that will be an indication of greenhouse gases that could have been found in the atmosphere over 100,000 years ago. Davies research on minuscule ash particles within the layers of ice, will help create a timeline of volcanic eruptions, which will help compare and analyze climatic evidence recorded in the Greenland ice with that preserved in the deep sea.

S4C filmed a series 'Her yr Hinsawdd' documenting Davies experience in meeting communities in Greenland and the Maldives affected by climate changes and in particular the ice caps melting.

Siwan Davies is also an advocate for promoting women in STEM, speaking at events like soapbox science in Swansea, 2014. She is a founding committee member of Swansea Science Grll and SwanStemWomen.

Career history

Publications

Journal articles

Prizes 
 2011 Philip Leverhulme prize in Geography £70,000.
 2013 Lyell Fund (Geological Society)

References

Further reading
 

Living people
Academics of Swansea University
Welsh scholars and academics
Year of birth missing (living people)